Ohlstadt station is a railway station in the municipality of Ohlstadt, in Bavaria, Germany. It is located on the Munich–Garmisch-Partenkirchen railway of Deutsche Bahn.

Services
 the following services stop at Ohlstadt:

References

External links
 
 Ohlstadt layout 
 

Railway stations in Bavaria
Buildings and structures in Garmisch-Partenkirchen (district)